Khaali Haath is a Pakistani television series aired on Geo Entertainment on 6 February 2017. It is produced by Abdullah Kadwani and Asad Qureshi under 7th Sky Entertainment. It stars Aiman Khan, Ali Abbas, Shehzad Sheikh and Kiran Haq in leads.

Plot 
Khaali Haath revolves around Mashal (Aiman), who is a gifted, beautiful, sensible and high-spirited girl. Her elder sister Sobia (Kiran Haq) receives a marriage proposal from Basil's (Ali Abbas) family. Mashal was out of town at the moments of commitment session. Basil sees his sister-in-law, Mashal, for the first time on the occasion of the engagement ceremony and instantly falls in love with her. He becomes obsessed with Mashal and develops an ultimate desire to attain her at any cost. Despite being her brother-in-law, he usually throws clues and indication that he is interested in her. Mashal finds herself in a miserable situation due to frequent harassment attempts from Basil. Mashal soon receives a marriage proposal from Haisam (Shehzad Sheikh) and Basil starts plotting diabolic schemes against this union. He misgiven Mashal by showing her uneven closeness between her husband (Haisam) and her younger sister (Umaima). And that she thought that Haisam is also trying to trap her sister just like Basil done with her. She start talking rudely with her husband. Basil set a trap for Mashal's younger sister, he employed a man in Haisam office because Umaima had start working with Haisam in his office. The man try to flirt with her and he succeed in realizing Umaima that he love her but Haisam warns Umaima that he is not good for her but she refuse to listen. The man take her to his home and decided to do Nikah right now. But Umaima refuses so he blackmails her. When their Nikah is going to happen, Haisan arrives instantaneously with police and they arrested the boys. Umaima apologies to Haisam and he takes her to his house. When Mashal sees them together, she wrongly blames Haisam and says that he kidnapped her and further. Everyone was shocked and heart broken Haisam slaps her in anger and goes to his room. Umaima told her all the story and she realizes his mistakes. On the other hand, Sobia hears Basil conversation about fake marriage certificate she confronts him due to which he slaps her and in anger he tell the truth that he love Mashal and wanted to marry her not Sobia. He locks Sobia in the room and later apologies to her but she shocks him by saying that if your daughter look likes Mashal then what will you do? Mashal apologies to Haisam and feels guilty and Haisam forgives her so the family becomes happy but when Sobia comes to their house crying everyone was worried she tells the truth to her mother and that Mashal listens and says her sister not to keep quiet . She tells everything to her husband about Basil's harassment . Haisam angrily leaves the house and Mashal calls Basil says to leave the house as Haisam has known everything and that he is going to beat you but Basil kills himself with gun when Mashal last time rejected his offer of coming to him.

Cast
 Aiman Khan as Mashal (Mishi)
 Ali Abbas as Basil (Dead)
 Shehzad Sheikh as Haisam
 Kiran Haq as Sobia
 Faria Sheikh as Humaima
 Rabia Noreen as Mishi's mother
 Nida Mumtaz as Farhat

Reception
The serial is one of the popular series of 2017. Ali Abbas received positive response for his portrayal as an antagonist.

References

7th Sky Entertainment
Pakistani drama television series
2017 Pakistani television series debuts
2017 Pakistani television series endings
Urdu-language television shows
Geo TV original programming